Olsenbanden Jr. is a Norwegian comedy franchise based around a series of films and TV series of under-age criminals, based on the Olsenbanden films. Despite the original Olsen Gang being a Danish invention, the child version was originally a Swedish idea, Lilla Jönssonligan, with Denmark and Norway later following suit.

Media

Films
 Olsenbanden Jr. går under Vann (2003) set in 1959
 Olsenbanden Jr. På Rocker'n (2004) set in 1960
 Olsenbanden Jr. på Cirkus (2005) set in 1960
 Olsenbanden Jr. og Sølvgruvens hemmelighet (English: The Junior Olsen Gang and the Silver Mine Mystery) (2007) set in 1960
 Olsenbanden Jr. og Det sorte gull (2009) set in 1961
 Olsenbanden Jr. og Mestertyvens skatt (2010) set in 1962

Cast overview
 Egon Olsen – Aksel Støren Aschjem, Ola Isaac Høgåsen Mæhlen, Oskar Øiestad and Thomas Stene-Johansen
 Kjell Jensen – Thomas Engeset, Robert Opsahl and Jonas Hoff Oftebro
 Benny Fransen – Lars Berteig Andersen, Ole Martin Wølner and Fridtjof Tangen
 Dynamitt-Harry – Jakob Schøyen Andersen, Jacob Beranek Hvattum and Petter Westlund
 Valborg - Julia Charlotte Geitvik, Maren Eikli Hiorth and Lina Sørlie Strand

TV series
 Olsenbandens første kupp (TV series, 2001)

Books
 Olsenbanden jr: første kupp, ; 2001
 Olsenbanden jr. på rocker'n, ; 2004
 Olsenbanden jr. på Cirkus, ; 2006
 Olsenbanden jr. : sølvgruvens hemmelighet, ; 2007

Video games
 Olsenbanden Jr. - I Vikingenes fotspor

Plays
 Olsenbanden jr. på rockern
 Olsenbanden jr. på Cirkus

Comics
Olsenbanden Jr. og millionlotteriet, 2001
Olsenbanden jr. hopper i det !, 2001

References

Olsenbanden
Children's film series
Mass media franchises introduced in 2001
Film series introduced in 2003